Latona was launched in 1786 at Newcastle upon Tyne. She spent her entire career as a merchantman. In 1800 a privateer captured her, but a British privateer recaptured her quickly. She foundered in 1835.

Career
Latona entered Lloyd's Register (LR) in 1787 with John Hall, master, and W. Lashly, owner, and trade London–Petersburg.

On 22 August 1800, Lloyd's List reported that the British privateer  had recaptured Latona, which a French privateer had captured as Latona was sailing from Memel to Lisbon. Earl Spencer sent Latona into Oporto.

Fate
Latona sprang a leak on 1 September 1835, resulting in her crew abandoning her in the Atlantic Ocean on 3 September. Olga rescued her crew. Latona was on a voyage from Padstow, Cornwall to Quebec City, Lower Canada.

Notes

Citations

References
 

1786 ships
Ships built on the River Tyne
Age of Sail merchant ships of England
Captured ships
Maritime incidents in 1800
Maritime incidents in 1835
Shipwrecks in the Atlantic Ocean